The Free Times Cafe is a live music venue and restaurant in Toronto, Ontario, Canada.

The cafe was purchased by Judy Perly in 1980. The restaurant serves a menu of Jewish, Middle Eastern and Canadian food as well as all-day breakfast.  The restaurant also has live music nightly and has featured singer-songwriters and performers such as Ron Sexsmith, Emm Gryner, Sarah Slean, Jack Carty, Keith Jolie, Esthero, The Lemon Bucket Orkestra, Lorne Ryder, Rehan Dalal, Erik Bleich, Jory Nash, Glen Hornblast, Laura Fernandez, Kat Goldman, Jason Fowler and Liam Titcomb. There is an open stage on Monday nights. Bob Snider's Live at the Free Times Cafe was recorded at the venue.

References

Restaurants in Toronto
Tourist attractions in Toronto
Restaurants established in 1980
Music venues in Toronto
Nightclubs in Toronto